The Einstein–Szilard or Einstein refrigerator is an absorption refrigerator which has no moving parts, operates at constant pressure, and requires only a heat source to operate. It was jointly invented in 1926 by Albert Einstein and his former student Leó Szilárd, who patented it in the U.S. on November 11, 1930. The three working fluids in this design are water, ammonia, and butane. The Einstein refrigerator is a development of the original three-fluid patent by the Swedish inventors Baltzar von Platen and Carl Munters.

History
From 1926 until 1934 Einstein and Szilárd collaborated on ways to improve home refrigeration technology. The two were motivated by contemporary newspaper reports of a Berlin family who had been killed when a seal in their refrigerator failed and leaked toxic fumes into their home. Einstein and Szilárd proposed that a device without moving parts would eliminate the potential for seal failure, and explored practical applications for different refrigeration cycles. Einstein had worked in the Swiss Patent Office, and used his experience to apply for valid patents for their inventions in several countries. The two were eventually granted 45 patents in six countries for three different models.

It has been suggested that most of the actual inventing was done by Szilárd, with Einstein merely acting as a consultant and helping with the patent-related paperwork, but others assert that Einstein contributed design work to the project.

The refrigerator was less efficient than existing appliances, although having no moving parts made it more reliable; the introduction of non-toxic Freon — later found to be responsible for serious depletion of the Earth's ozone layer — to replace toxic refrigerant gases made it even less attractive commercially. The Great Depression of 1929 dried up funding for development, and the widespread political violence in Nazi Germany, where the inventors lived, particularly towards Jews such as Einstein and Szilard, contributed to the device's lack of commercial success. (The inventors fled Germany in the early 1930s.) It was not immediately put into commercial production, although the most promising of the patents were quickly bought up by the Swedish company Electrolux. Einstein and Szilárd earned $750 (the equivalent of $10,000 in 2017). A few demonstration units were constructed from other patents.

One variant, the Einstein–Szilard electromagnetic refrigerator used a Einstein–Szilard electromagnetic pump to compress a working gas, pentane. Although the refrigerator was not a commercial success, the Einstein–Szilard pump was later used for cooling breeder reactors, where its inherent reliability and safety were important.

In 2008, electrical engineers at Oxford University's Energy and Power Group, part of the university's Department of Engineering Science, revived the Einstein refrigerator as an attempt to produce a refrigerator suitable for use in rural areas without electricity. The group, led by Malcolm McCulloch noted that the design was still "nowhere near commercialised", but might allow the efficiency of the original Einstein–Szilárd design to be quadrupled.

See also
 Rudolf Goldschmidt (for the Einstein–Goldschmidt hearing aid)
 Icyball
 Timeline of low-temperature technology

Notes

References
 Einstein, A., L. Szilárd, "Refrigeration" (Appl: 16 December 1927; Priority: Germany, 16 December 1926) , 11 November 1930.
 Einstein, A., L. Szilárd, "Accompanying notes and remarks for Pat. No. 1,781,541". Mandeville Special Collections Library USC. Box 35, Folder 3, 1927; 52 pages.
 Einstein, A., L. Szilárd, "Improvements Relating to Refrigerating Apparatus." (Appl: 16 December. 1927; Priority: Germany, 16 December 1926). Patent Number 282,428 (United Kingdom). Complete accept.: 5 November 1928.

External links
 Flanigan, Allen, "Einsteins "Automatischer Beton-Volks-Kühlschrank" (German site) Wolfgang Engels from the University of Oldenburg rebuilt the original concept—the housing is manufactured out of concrete, i.e. the total mass of the completed apparatus is around 400 kg with 20 kg of alcohol in the refrigeration cycle. The project was completed in 2005.
 US patent 1781541 (European Patent Office)
 GB patent 282428 (European Patent Office)
 How kerosene refrigerators work. (archived)

Refrigerator
Cooling technology
Gas technologies
Heat pumps
Heating, ventilation, and air conditioning
Thermodynamic cycles
1926 in science
1930 in science
Refrigerators